Wait for Me is the third studio album by American blues artist Susan Tedeschi, released in 2002.

Track listing
"Alone" (Tommy Sims) – 4:21
"Gonna Move" (Paul Pena) – 4:23
"Wrapped in the Arms of Another" (Tedeschi) – 3:03
"'Til I Found You" (Tom Hambridge, Tedeschi) – 3:32
"Wait for Me" (Felix Reyes) – 4:47
"The Feeling Music Brings" (Kofi Burbridge, Tedeschi, Derek Trucks) – 7:15
"In the Garden" (Tommy Shannon, Tedeschi) – 3:45
"Hampmotized" (Jason Crosby, Ron Perry, Jeff Sipe, Tedeschi) – 3:10
"Don't Think Twice, It's All Right" (Bob Dylan) – 4:43
"I Fell in Love" (Tom Hambridge, Tedeschi) – 3:29
"Blues on a Holiday" (Paul Rishell) – 3:02

Personnel
Susan Tedeschi - rhythm guitar, vocals, soloist
Paul Ahlstrand - tenor saxophone
Scott Aruda - trumpet
Tino Barker - tenor saxophone
Kevin Barry - acoustic guitar, soloist
Gordon Beadle - baritone saxophone
Joe Bonadio - drums
Kofi Burbridge - organ, piano
Dean Cassell - bass
Jason Crosby - organ, piano, violin, keyboards
Drew Glackin - bass
Col. Bruce Hampton
Johnnie Johnson - piano
Dave Mattacks - drums
David McNair - bass, rhythm guitar
Ron Perry - bass
Annie Raines - harmonica
Milt Reder - electric guitar
Paul Rishell - guitar
Yonrico Scott - percussion, drums
Noah Simon - mellotron
Jeff Sipe - drums
Todd Smallie - bass
Derek Trucks - guitar
Tom West - organ

Production
Producers: Susan Tedeschi, Steve Berlin, Tom Dowd, Derek Trucks
Executive producer: Richard Rosenblatt
Engineers: Jeff Bakos, Nate Dube, David McNair, Noah Simon, Peter Thornton, Greg Trampe, André Zweers
Mixing: David McNair
Mastering: Robert Hadley
Assistant: Joe Sullivan
Horn arrangements: Paul Ahlstrand
Design: Frank Olinsky

Charts
Album - Billboard (North America)

References

Susan Tedeschi albums
2002 albums
Albums produced by Tom Dowd